Aami is a 2018 Indian Malayalam-language biographical film based on the life of poet-author Kamala Das. It is written and directed by Kamal and stars Manju Warrier as Kamala Surayya, along with Murali Gopy, Tovino Thomas, Anoop Menon and Anand Bal. The film was released on 9 February 2018. The film won two Kerala State Film Awards.

Plot 
Aami  portrays the life of writer Madhavikutty, mainly focused on her childhood, family life, marital life, a devotee of Lord Krishna and conversion to Islam in the later periods of her life.

Cast
 Manju Warrier as Kamala Surayya (Kamala)
 Neelanjana as Aami Teenage
 Aangelina Abraham Aami Childhood
 Tovino Thomas as Sreekrishnan
 Murali Gopy as Madhava Das, Madhavikutty's husband
 Anoop Menon as Akbar Ali
 Rasna Pavithran as Young Balamani Amma
 Vijayalakshmi as Old Balamani Amma
 Anil Nedumangad as V. M. Nair
 K. P. A. C. Lalitha as Januvamma
 Vinaya Prasad as Sulochana Nalappat, writer and Kamala's sister
 Jitha as Sulochana Nalapat Young
 Swasthika as Sulochana Nalapat Childhood
 Rahul Madhav as Kamala's imaginary friend
 Indrans as Narayanan, Goldsmith 
 Jyothikrishna as Malathi
 Anjali Nair as Khamar
 Balachandran Chullikadu a Himself
 Renji Panicker as S. K. Nair, Malayalanadu Editor
 Lekshmi Priya as Madhavikutty fan
 Sreedevi Unni as Ammamma
 Valsala Menon as Muttashi
 Lal Kumar as Monu (MD Nalappatt)
 Uttara as Young Januvamma
 Krishnan Balakrishnan as reporter
 Dinesh Prabhakar as angry husband of Madhavikutty fan
 Jayaraj Warrier as Sukumaran
 Sethu Lakshmi as Kuttiamma
 Kritika Pradeep
 Anand Bal as Chinnan Das

Production
In 2016, Bollywood actress Vidya Balan was signed for the role of Kamala Surayya, but in January 2017, she backed out from the film citing creative differences with Kamal. In 2016, Murali Gopy was confirmed in the role of Madhava Das, Kamala's husband, and Prithviraj Sukumaran in a fictional character. Later in the year, Prithviraj also opted out from the film due to his tight filming schedules and recommended Tovino Thomas instead. Later, Anoop Menon was added to the cast. Media outlets reported several names as a replacement for Balan, but in February 2017 Kamal denied all the reports and said that he is not in a hurry and is still looking for a person whose features match that of Surayya's, which was the reason he chose Balan at the first place. Although he revealed he is also considering suggestions from others and Parvathy is one among. In February 2017, Manju Warrier signed to play Kamala Surayya.

Principal photography commenced on 24 March 2017 at Kamala Surayya Memorial in Punnayurkulam, Thrissur. Ottapalam was the main location in the first schedule that went till April. The other locations were Mumbai, Kolkata and Ernakulam.

Soundtrack 

The film score is composed by Bijibal. The film features original songs composed by two composers, M. Jayachandran and Taufiq Qureshi. Qureshi's compositions are Ghazals with lyrics written by Academy Award winner Gulzar. The lyrics for the Malayalam songs is written by Rafeeq Ahamed.

Awards and nominations 
Flowers Indian Film Awards
Best Actress – 2018 – Manju Warrier (shared with Udaharanam Sujatha)
 Asia Vision awards
Best Actress  – 2018 – Manju Warrier
Nana Awards
Best actress  – 2018 – Manju Warrier
Kerala State Film Awards
Best Female Playback Singer- Shreya Ghoshal
Best Background Score- Bijibal
Vanitha Film Awards
Best Actress- Manju Warrier
Asianet Film Awards
Best Actress- Manju Warrier
Filmfare Awards South
Best Actress- Manju Warrier
8th South Indian International Movie Awards
Nominated for Best Singer- Shreya Goshal

References

External links
 

2018 films
2010s Malayalam-language films
2018 biographical drama films
Films directed by Kamal (director)
Films scored by M. Jayachandran
Indian biographical drama films
Films shot in Thrissur
Films shot in Ottapalam
Films shot in Mumbai
Films shot in Kolkata
Films shot in Palakkad
Biographical films about writers
Biographical films about poets
2018 drama films